Maani is a surname. Notable people with the surname include:

Fauoa Maani, Tuvaluan politician
Iraj Maani (born 1985), Iranian mountaineer
Omar Maani, Jordanian mayor
Sholeh Maani, New Zealand economics academic

See also
Ma'n dynasty (alternatively spelled Ma'an), also known as the Ma'nids, a family of Druze chiefs of Arab stock based in the rugged Chouf area of southern Mount Lebanon
Fakhr al-Din II or Fakhr al-Din ibn Qurqumaz ibn Yunus Ma'n, Druze emir of Mount Lebanon known as Fakhr al-Dinal Ma'ni
Vanguard of the Maani Army (Movement of the Druze Jihad)